Carlsbad High School (CHS) is located in Carlsbad, New Mexico, United States, and has a student population of over 1600 students. It is a part of the Carlsbad Municipal School District.

In addition to Carlsbad, the Carlsbad district, of which Carlsbad High is the only comprehensive high school, includes: Happy Valley, La Huerta, Livingston Wheeler, Malaga, and Whites City. The school also serves the nearby communities of Queen and Otis.

CHS received a "C" grade from the New Mexico Public Education Department in 2016.

Campus
The Carlsbad High School Campus was opened in 1962, with the conversion of the previous high school into what is present-day Carlsbad Intermediate School. Carlsbad High School consists of nine buildings scattered across a large campus. The Main Building is a three-story building with an interior atrium opening to the northeast. Also on campus are the Freshman Academy (where classes for most freshmen are held), the Science Building, the PAD (housing the History and Math departments), the cafeteria (also housing the theatre department), the Gym Complex (including a public-access natatorium), the Performing Arts Center (containing the band, choir, dance, and cheerleading programs), the Arts and Crafts building, and the Building Trades Center. CHS is the largest high school campus in the state of New Mexico, and one of the largest in the country.

Mascot and colors
CHS' athletic teams are known as the Cavemen (boys) and Cavegirls (girls), a tribute to the world-famous Carlsbad Caverns located near the city.

The school's mascot is a caveman named "Rusty". Rusty received his name from the first Caveman statue placed on display in the Main Building. This statue was often decorated and dressed in blue for special occasions (e.g. district championships, rivalry victories, state championships). Rusty was often subject to abuse from rival high schools. For example, Artesia High School students once kidnapped and dropped him at Lake Avalon, just north of Carlsbad. Local residents retrieved him from the lake after a few years had passed. He now resides in the library (on the third floor of the Main Building) facing out the window and overlooking the campus.

School colors are blue, silver, and white.

Athletics
CHS competes in the New Mexico Activities Association (NMAA), as a class 6A school in District 3. In 2013, the NMAA realigned the state's schools in to six classifications and adjusted district boundaries.   Carlsbad High School has a total of 68 state titles, which puts it in fourth place for most state titles across all sports divisions in New Mexico.

CHS competes in a wide variety of sports as the Cavemen and Cavegirls:

 Tennis - Cavemen and Cavegirl tennis both compete. New tennis courts were opened in the 2009-2010 academic school year. The Cavegirls were district and state champions five years in a row, beginning in 2006. The Cavemen won the state championship in tennis in 2012.
 Volleyball - Cavegirl volleyball won the 2010 district championship.
 Football - The Cavemen football team has a total of eight state championships, but their most recent one was in 1962. The team plays at Ralph Bowyer Cavemen Stadium (named after a former Cavemen football player and later coach in 1962) on campus, which has a capacity of nearly 7000 people. The team wears silver helmets with a single blue stripe and a blue wishbone "C"; the jerseys and pants are both solid blue. The away jerseys and pants are white. 
Throughout the 1980s into 2005, in addition to the traditional blue home uniforms with silver helmets, the team wore silver visiting jerseys and pants. During their 2010 season, the Cavemen went 7-3 in the regular season, and won the District 4 AAAAA title by defeating the Clovis Wildcats 14-13. The Cavemen then defeated the West Mesa High School Mustangs 35-19 in their first home playoff game since 2002. However, the Cavemen fell next week to the Manzano High School Monarchs 39-29. This season marked a major turnaround for head coach Ron Arrington. In 2011, the Cavemen finished the regular season 8-2, as well as defeating the Artesia Bulldogs and the Mayfield Trojans, the latter of whom Carlsbad had not defeated since 1992.

 Basketball - The Cavemen basketball team has three state championships, the most recent of which occurred in 1955. In 2016, however, they were state runner-ups.
 Baseball and softball - The Carlsbad High School baseball and softball teams have many state championships each. The Cavemen play at the Caveman Corral and the Cavegirls at Cavegirl Park. The Cavemen and Cavegirls both won the district championship in 2010, and the Cavegirls won the state championship over Rio Rancho High School 7-6. The Cavemen claimed the 2012 baseball title over Sandia High School, their first title since 2002. In 2016, The Cavemen also claimed the 2016 State Championship title against Rio Rancho.
 Men's and women's soccer - The Cavemen and Cavegirl soccer teams both play their varsity soccer games at Ralph Bowyer Cavemen Stadium.
 Swimming and Diving - The Carlsbad High School swim team have been around for many years. An additional dive team was created in the 2009-2010 academic year.
 Wrestling - The Cavemen wrestlers have been frequent participants in the state championships, winning nine state championships (the most state championships of any Cavemen sport).  In addition to multiple one, two, three, and four time individual state champions, the Cavemen also boast the first five-time individual state champion; there have only been two in New Mexico history.

Rivalries
The Cavemen have several powerful rivalries that they participate in. The Cavemen have their standard district rivalry with the Hobbs Eagles. Carlsbad holds the overall series against both in baseball and softball, while Clovis holds football and Hobbs holds basketball. Carlsbad also has a bitter rivalry with the Artesia Bulldogs, which is referred to by the two schools as "The Eddy County War" or "The Battle for Eddy County". Carlsbad holds an overall series in football, but by less than 10 wins as Artesia has beat the Cavemen six times in a row. The Cavemen traditionally beat the Bulldogs at home in basketball while the Bulldogs often win at home. This is a powerful but friendly rivalry and is one of the longest running high school rivalries in the state of New Mexico. Other regional rivals include the Goddard Rockets, the Roswell Coyotes, the Alamogordo Tigers, and the Mayfield Trojans, as these teams play each other often.

Notable alumni
 Shane Andrews, former MLB player (Montreal Expos, Chicago Cubs, Boston Red Sox)
 Terry Cox, former MLB player (California Angels)
 Paxton Crawford, former MLB player (Boston Red Sox)
 Mark Jackson, former CFL football player
 Bob Kelly, former NFL football player
 Fred K. Mahaffey, United States Army four-star general
 Cody Ross, current MLB player (Detroit Tigers, Los Angeles Dodgers, Cincinnati Reds, Florida Marlins, San Francisco Giants, Boston Red Sox, and the Arizona Diamondbacks)
 Dave Sherer, former NFL football player
 John Wooten, former NFL football player
 Trevor Rogers, first round pick in the 2017 MLB Draft by the Miami Marlins
Linda Wertheimer, American Radio Journalist for NPR

See also

 Carlsbad Municipal School District

References

External links
 Carlsbad High School
 Carlsbad Municipal School District

 
Public high schools in New Mexico
Schools in Eddy County, New Mexico
Educational institutions established in 1908
1908 establishments in New Mexico Territory